Beaches in Indonesia are extensive, characterized by coral reefs, deposits from volcanoes, rich marine biodiversity, strong ocean currents, and associated with diverse cultural traditions.

Indonesia is located in a region of abundant coral reefs known as the Coral Triangle as well as being the country with the most volcanoes in the world. Some beaches are derived from fluvial sands and gravels, others from cliff erosion. Coral reefs form white or yellow sanded beaches, while beach sediments derived from volcanic rocks are typically black or grey, such as those of northern Bali and southern Java. In the granitic zone of the Riau, Bangka and Belitung Islands, white quartz sands as well as granite boulders dominate. Sandy backshores are colonized by coastal vegetation, notably Ipomoea pes-caprae and Spinifex littoreus, then coconut and casuarina trees. Coastal dunes are poorly developed in the humid tropics, but on the southern shores of Java and Sumatra, prograded beaches are backed by dunes, some of which carry woodland vegetation. Large deposits of lava and ash from volcanic eruptions may transport large quantities of pyroclastic sediment down to the coast, such as at Mount Merapi in southern Java and Mount Agung in Bali. The area within the Coral Triangle is associated with rich marine biodiversity. Beaches in the area, such as those that are important turtle nesting beaches, are protected by the government.

Wave action in Indonesian waters is largely generated by local winds, gentle in the equatorial zone but stronger on the northern and southern coasts subject to northeast and southeast trade winds, respectively. Ocean swell moves into the southern coast from the Indian Ocean and to the northern coast from the southwest Pacific, are creating particularly large waves in this area.

Some beaches are considered sacred and ritual processions are held on these. Sea temples are erected on the coasts of Bali, Lombok, and Java to appease the god or goddess of the Sea. Some beaches on the southern coast of Java are considered sacred because of their association with the figure of Nyai Roro Kidul, Queen of the Southern Sea. In accordance with Javanese beliefs, people are warned not to wear green clothes on these beaches because the color is sacred to her and wearing it may offend her and cause the person to drown into the sea. Rituals are enacted on beaches such as Parangtritis, Pangandaran, Karang Bolong Beach, Ngliyep, Puger, and Banyuwangi.

Below is a list of notable Indonesian beaches. The list is sorted by provinces roughly west to east, north to south; and then alphabetically by the name of the beach, ignoring the words "beach" or "pantai" (Indonesian "beach"). To avoid mistranslation, the names of the beaches are listed by translating the word pantai into "beach". Translation of other words, such as Tanjung (Indonesian for "cape") or Pasir Putih (Indonesian for "white sand"), are ignored.

Aceh

The most notable beaches for tourism in Aceh are located to the northern tip of the province, near the archipelago of Sabang, the capital city of Banda Aceh and the northern regency of Aceh Besar.  Normally formed in a bay area, many beaches contains the word Lhok, Acehnese for "bay". Owing to their strategic location during World War II, some of the northern beaches contain bunkers and concrete pillboxes constructed by the Japanese troops.

The western coastal areas of Aceh were among the areas hardest hit by the 2004 tsunami. Many of the pristine beaches and coral reefs were devastated. The area was slowly rebuilt after the disaster and tourism is slowly returning to normal.

Weh Island
Weh Island is a volcanic island known for its underwater fumaroles which can be accessed by diving. There are many beaches in this island:
 Gapang Beach. The beach contains the highest variation of accommodation in the Weh Island. The sea of Gapang Beach contains underwater fumaroles called Hydrothermal Point and is suitable for diving
 Iboih Beach. A few meters from Iboih is the Rubiah islet that is known for its coral reefs and the beach is popular for diving.
 Kasih Beach
 Paradiso Beach
 Sumur Tiga Beach

Aceh Besar Regency
There are many beautiful beaches in Aceh Besar Regency:
 Lampu'uk Beach, Lhoknga subdistrict. The beach was devastated by the 2004 Tsunami. The beach has been restored and tourists are returning to the beach.
 Lhoknga Beach, Lhoknga subdistrict. The beach and the neighboring town of Lhoknga was completely wiped out by the 2004 tsunami. The beach has been restored and tourists are returning to the beach.
 Lhok Me Beach in Mesjid Raya subdistrict.
 Hidden beaches of Ujông Pancu:
 Lhôk Mata Ië Beach
 Lhôk Keutapang Cut Beach
 Lhôk Keutapang Rayek Beach
 Ië Rah Beach
 Langè Beach
 Ujong Batee Beach. The beach is known for the concrete pillboxes constructed by the Japanese during the World War II.

Lhokseumawe
Located in the northern side of Sumatra, the insular city of Lhokseumawe (part of the North Aceh Regency until its separation in 2001 to form an independent city) contains beaches that is known for its calm water.
 Meuraksa Beach
 Rancong Beach
 Ujong Blang Beach

North Sumatra
Notable beaches of North Sumatra province are on the island of Nias and are surfing destinations. Despite the long history of surfing in Nias, international surfing in has slowed down in part due to the 2004 tsunami and following  earthquakes.  The situation is slowly changing, however.
Cermin Beach, Serdang Bedagai
Beaches of Nias Island.
Lagundri Beach and Sorake Beach, Teluk Dalam, South Nias. The two beaches enclose the Sorake Bay, an international surfing spot.

Riau Islands
Riau Islands Province being insular in character, contains many beaches. The most notable of these are located in Bintan Island, the largest island in the province. Bintan Resorts contains beach-front International hotels and resorts. Many of the resorts are Singaporean owned and the island is marketed to Singaporeans for whom Bintan is a short ferry trip away. Currently, Indonesian government is promoting Bintan as the next best tourist destination after Bali.
Palawan Beach, Great Karimun
Pongkar Beach, Great Karimun

West Sumatra

The beaches of West Sumatra are located on the western coast of the province.
Air Manis Beach, Padang
Arta Pariaman Beach
Bungus Beach, Bungus Bay, Padang
Carocok Beach, Painan
Caroline Beach
Gandoriah Beach, Pariaman. Tabuik, The local interpretation of the Islamic festival of Muharram is held on the beach.
Padang Beach, Padang
Pasir Bajak Beach, Padang

Bangka-Belitung Islands

Bangka-Belitung Islands are known for their white sanded beaches with clear blue water and granite boulders. Granite boulders and white sand quartz that dominate the beaches are associated with the late Paleozoic-early Triassic Era's Granite Belt formation on the western side of Indonesia.
Beaches of Bangka Island:
Air Anyir Beach
Batu Bedaun Beach
Matras Beach
Parai Tenggiri Beach
Pasir Padi Beach
Penyusuk Beach
Rambak Beach
Romodong Beach
Tanjung Kalian Beach
Tanjung Pesona Beach
Tanjung Ular Beach
Teluk Uber Beach
Temberan Beach
Tikus Beach
Beaches of Belitung:
Beaches of Lengkuas Island
Punai Beach
Tanjung Binga Beach
Tanjung Kelayang Beach
Tanjung Tinggi Beach

Bengkulu
The beaches of Bengkulu are located on the Indian Ocean western coast of the province.
Panjang Beach, Bengkulu
Pasir Putih Beach, Baii Island

South Sumatra
The northern coastline of South Sumatra is mostly covered in mangrove forests with rare well-formed beaches. The water carry large sandy deposits, forming a deltaic plains in the river mouth. Most cities or towns are located to the south of the province.

Lampung
The beaches of Lampung are located to the east, west, and south of the province. The beaches of the southeast coast in the Sunda Strait were affected by the historical volcano blast of Krakatau in 1883.
Bagus Beach, South Lampung
Merak Belantung Beach, South Lampung
Mutun Beach, Lempasing
Sapenan Beach, South Lampung
Terbaya Beach, Kota Agung. Hindu people performs the Melasti ritual on Terbaya beach.

Banten

Notable beaches of Banten are located on the western coast of the province. The coast between Anyer and Labuan is mainly formed by an emerged fringing coral reef. Coral boulders are widespread along the shore, swept in from fringing coral reefs by the 1883 tsunami and deposited on the shore platform and the coastal plain. Monuments are erected on several beach to commemorate the victim of the tsunami.

Anyer Beach, Anyer
Carita Beach, Pandeglang
Karang Bolong Beach, Karangbolong, Pandeglang.
Sawarna Beach, Sawarna, Lebak
Tanjung Lesung Beach, Pandeglang
Ciputih Beach
Peucang Beach

West Java

The province of West Java contains beaches on both its northern coast and southern coast. The beaches of the northern coast are known for its calm water due to the low wave-energy of the Java Sea. The more notable beaches on the southern coast are known for the big waves and famous for surfing. Some beaches on the southern coast are considered sacred due to their association with Nyai Roro Kidul. The Javanese beliefs warn people not to wear green clothes on these beaches because the color is sacred and wearing one may offend her and cause the person to drown into the sea.

The Samudra Beach Hotel, one of the first resort of Indonesia in Pelabuhan Ratu Beach, keeps one of its room, room 308, furnished with green colors as part of the sacred reservation for Nyai Roro Kidul, a sacred figure believed to be the ruler of the Southern Sea.
Batu Hiu Beach. Batu Hiu translates as "shark rock", it is called so because of a nearby rock formation shaped like a shark's fin.
Batukaras Beach, Batukaras
Cijayana Beach, Garut
Cimaja Beach, Pelabuhan Ratu Subdistrict, Sukabumi.
Karang Hawu Beach, Sukabumi Regency. The beach is one of the sacred beach of Nyai Roro Kidul; the place where Nyai Roro Kidul leapt into the ocean to regain her lost beauty and never returned. A shrine was built on top of the cliff.
Karang Paranje Beach, Garut
Pangandaran Beach, Pangandaran. The beach is one of the sacred beach of Nyai Roro Kidul.
Pelabuhan Ratu Beach, Pelabuhan Ratu, Sukabumi. The beach is one of the sacred beach of Nyai Roro Kidul.
Rancabuaya Beach, Garut
Santolo Beach, Garut
Ujung Genteng Beach, Sukabumi Regency

Jakarta Special Capital Region

Jakarta, the capital of Indonesia, has a beach on its northern coast in Jakarta Bay. The water of Jakarta Bay is relatively polluted, the result of the poor living condition of the majority of people living along the bay, as well as nutrient inputs from agricultural runoff, industrial pollution, and waste water.

The more pristine beaches of Jakarta are located in Thousand Islands, the only regency of Jakarta Special Capital Region. Being located further away from Java island, the islands' beach are less effected by pollution coming from the Jakarta Bay. Being a coral island, the beaches of Thousand Islands are white-sanded.

Festival Beach, Ancol, North Jakarta
Beaches of the Thousand Islands

Central Java

The beaches of Central Java are located both on the northern and southern coast. Many of the notable beaches are located to the northern coast, known for the relatively calm water of the Java Sea
Alam Indah Beach, Tegal
Tirto Samodra Beach (Bandengan Beach), Jepara
Kartini Beach, Jepara 
Blebak Beach, Jepara
Ombak Mati Beach, Jepara
Pecatu Beach (Gua Manik Beach), Jepara
Pailus Beach, Jepara
Suweru Beach, Jepara
Empurancak Beach, Jepara
Beaches of Karimun Jawa.
Barakuda Beach
Legon Lele Beach
Tanjung Gelam Beach
Karang Bolong Beach, Cilacap
Jatimalang Beach, Purworejo
Marina Beach, Semarang
Beaches of Nusa Kambangan
Purwahamba Beach, Tegal
Sembukan Beach, Wonogiri Regency. According to the local myth, the beach is the thirteenth gate of the Kingdom of Ratu Kidul and a meeting point of the queen of the Kingdom, Nyai Roro Kidul, and the kings of Surakarta Sunanate. An offering ritual is held on Sembukan beach annually.
Teluk Penyu Beach, Cilacap
Widuri Beach, Pemalang
Menganti Beach, Kebumen
Petanahan Beach, Kebumen
Lembupurwo Beach, Kebumen
Suwuk Beach, Kebumen

Yogyakarta (special region)

Beaches in Yogyakarta are located on the southern coast. In Gunung Kidul Regency, the beaches are known for its karst formation, forming hills and limestone caves near the beach.

Other notable beaches are the ones around Parangtritis: Parangtritis Beach and Parangkusumo Beach. The sacred Parangkusumo beach is considered as the place where Panembahan Senopati sought the support of the goddess of the Southern Ocean, Nyai Roro Kidul, Queen of the Southern Sea. A procession of the labuhan alit (giving an offering by throwing out certain things to the sea) is done annually on the beach. These beaches are also known for the coastal sand dune formations.

Baron Beach, Gunung Kidul
Congot Beach, Kulon Progo
Depok Beach, Bantul
Drini Beach, Gunung Kidul
Glagah Beach, Kulon Progo
Indrayanti Beach, Gunung Kidul
Krakal Beach, Gunung Kidul
Kukup Beach, Gunung Kidul
Ngobaran Beach, Gunung Kidul
Ngrenean Beach, Gunung Kidul
Parangkusumo Beach, Parangtritis
Parangtritis Beach, Parangtritis
Pok Tunggal Beach, Gunung Kidul
Sadeng Beach, Gunung Kidul
Sepanjang Beach, Gunung Kidul
Siung Beach, Gunung Kidul
Sundak Beach, Gunung Kidul
Trisik Beach, Kulon Progo
Wediombo Beach, Gunung Kidul

East Java

Both the north and south coasts of East Java contain beaches. As with the other provinces of Java, the southern beaches are known for their large waves while the northern beaches are known for their calm waters. Several beaches on the southern coast are considered sacred due to their association with Nyai Roro Kidul.

Balekambang Beach, Malang
G-Land or Plengkung Beach, Alas Purwo National Park
Goa China Beach, Bantengan Village, Malang. The beach is known for its large rocky outcrops and white sand beach.
Klayar Beach, Pacitan
Ngliyep Beach, Malang. The beach is one of the sacred beach of Nyai Roro Kidul.
Puger Beach, Jember. The beach is one of the sacred beaches of Nyai Roro Kidul. Puger Beach is known as a surfing spot and the beach also contains extensive sand dunes which reach the height up to 20 meters.
Sendang Biru Beach, Malang
Sukamade Beach, Meru Betiri National Park. A turtle conservation area was established on the beach in 1972, older than the National Park itself.
Tamban Beach, Malang, www.tambanindah.tk 
Watu Karung Beach, Pacitan
Wedi Ireng Beach, Pancer, Banyuwangi.

Bali

Bali is surrounded with beaches and coral reefs. Most of the beaches are variation of tan or grey sanded beaches, while the white sand beaches are not that common. Surf conditions range from limp to torrid, depending on whether there is an offshore reef.

The beach of Bali plays an important part in the Balinese Hindu ritual. Before the day of Nyepi, Hindu worshipers have to perform the Melasti Ritual, which should be enacted in a Balinese temple that is located near the sea (Pura Segara or "Sea Temple"). This is done to purify the sacred objects belonging to several temples, as well as to acquire the sacred waters from the sea.

Amed Beach, Karangasem. Amed Beach is a black sand beach lined with traditional outrigger fishing boats. The beach is known for it marine sea life and is a snorkeling spot.
Beaches of Nusa Lembongan
Mushroom Bay Beach
Beaches of Nusa Dua. Nusa Dua is home to some of the most exclusive resorts in Bali.
Geger Beach. The beach contains a seaweed farming area.
Beaches of Nusa Penida
Beaches of Pecatu. The resort area contains beaches surrounded with cliffs. The beaches are popular surfing spot.
Bingin Beach
Balangan Beach
Crystal Bay Beach. The water is best known for the sightings of Mola mola
Impossible Beach
Padang Padang Beach
Pandawa Beach
Suluban Beach
Candidasa Beach, Karangasem
Canggu Beach, Canggu
Dreamland Beach.
Kuta Beach, Kuta. Kuta beach is the most popular beach. Originally a surfing destination Kuta Beach is nowadays Bali's party beach and is packed with hotels, restaurants, bars and night clubs. The district is known as the location of the 2002 Bali bombings.
Jimbaran Beach, Jimbaran. The beach is populated by many luxurious resorts.
Legian Beach
Lovina Beach, Lovina. Lovina contains black sand beaches, and is also known for dolphin spotting.
Padang Bai Beach.
Sanur Beach, Sanur. The historic beach is known for its old time flavor and local feeling.
Seminyak Beach

West Nusa Tenggara

The beaches of the islands in the West Nusa Tenggara is less promoted than the neighboring island of Bali. Being surrounded by coral reefs, the white sand beach of the islands are the most notable.

The second largest island of West Nusa Tenggara, Lombok, as well as the closest island to Bali, is gaining more popularity for the western tourists who are looking for a remote island experience.

The largest island of West Nusa Tenggara, the island of Sumbawa, is less promoted and less developed than Lombok, although some of the beaches have become a popular spot for surf culture.

Beaches of Gili Islands.
Beaches of Lombok
Kuta Beach, named after a nearby village of Kuta. The beach is known for the traditional ritual of Bau Nyale, which is a marine worm hunting ritual, a prelude for the larger Pasola festival.
Mawun Beach
Senggigi Beach, one of the most popular beach of Lombok
Beaches of Sumbawa:
Hu'u Beach
Lakey Beach
Lawar Beach
Sekongkang Beach
Supersuck Beach

East Nusa Tenggara

East Nusa Tenggara is the southernmost province of Indonesia. The province consists of many small islands, often divided by deep oceanic trenches. The island's southern coast is affected by the swell of the Indian Ocean and produces large waves popular with surfers.

The relatively isolated position of these islands of the southern part of the Lesser Sunda Islands means that the evolution of life is localized. The most famous of the islands is the Komodo Island, the only island where the Komodo dragon can be found. Climate on this part of Indonesia is the driest climate in Indonesia. This combination of effects create a rare form of beaches in Indonesia: a relatively dry beach surrounded with endemic plants or dry cliffs.

Beaches of Flores:
Pede Beach, Labuan Bajo.
Beaches of Kanawa Island
Beaches of Komodo Island
Pink Beach
Beaches of Sumba:
Etreat Beach
Marosi Beach
Nihiwatu Beach. The world class surf spot known as Occy's Left featured in the film The Green Iguana is located on this beach. It is also a private beach that is owned by Nihi Sumba Resort. There are only 10 "surf slots" per day for Occy's Left which cost US$100 per surfer.
Tarikaha Beach
Wanokaka Beach
Lasiana Beach, Kupang

West Kalimantan
Notable beaches of West Kalimantan are located to the south of province, usually in the regencies of Bengkayang, Sambas, and Ketapang Regency.

Batu Payung Beach, Bengkayang
Jawai Beach, Sambas.
Kijing Beach, Mempawah, Pontianak Regency
Kura-kura Beach, Bengkayang.
Pasir Panjang Beach, Bengkayang
Selimpai Beach, Sambas. The beach is known as a nesting beach for green sea turtle, hawksbill sea turtle, and olive ridley sea turtle
Sungai Jawi Beach, Ketapang
Tanjung Batu Beach, Ketapang

Central Kalimantan
Beaches of Central Kalimantan is located to the south of the province.
Kubu Beach, West Kotawaringin
Sabaru Beach, Pahandut Subdistrict
Ujung Pandaran Beach, East Kotawaringin

South Kalimantan
Swarangan Beach, Swarangan, Jorong Subdistrict, Tanah Laut
Takisung Beach, Banjarmasin

East Kalimantan

Batu Lamampu Beach, Nunukan
Lamaru Beach, Balikpapan
Manggar Sagara Sari Beach, Balikpapan
Marina Beach, Balikpapan
Senipah Beach, Balikpapan
Derawan Islands, Berau Regency, East Kalimantan. Derawan islands is a part of Coral Triangle and have at least two ponds contain unpoisoned jellyfish, one in Kakaban Island and the other in Maratua Island with Haji Buang Pond.

Gorontalo

 Saronde Island. This is one of the most beautiful white sand beach in Indonesia. Can be reach in 40 minutes from Gorontalo Airport. Many International Cruiser and yacht visit this Island frequently every year.
 Lahilote Beach, Gorontalo. This brown sand beach has a clear calm water and contains a natural landmark which is a rock formed like the palm of a foot. The rock is said to be the footprint of Lahilote, a figure in local folklore.

North Sulawesi

The beaches of North Sulawesi are known for their high level of biodiversity due to their location within the Coral Triangle, making them a popular destination for snorkeling and diving.
Batu Nona Beach, North Minahasa
Batu Putih Beach, near Tangkoko Batuangus Nature Reserve
Beaches of Bunaken Island
Likupang Beach, Bitung. The beach is known for its white sand and the clear blue water.
Tasik Ria Beach, Manado
Temboko Lehi Beach, Siau

Central Sulawesi
Some of the most notable beaches of Central Sulawesi are the beach resorts of Togian Islands, with their characteristic coral reefs and white sanded beaches. Togian is known as the only place in Indonesia with three major reef environments; atoll, barrier, and fringing reefs.
Tanjung Karang Beach
Boneoge Beach, Donggala
Pusat Laut Beach, Donggala 
Lalos Beach, Toli-Toli
Madale Beach, Poso
Matako Beach, Poso
Moian Beach, Taopa Subdistrict, Parigi Moutong
Toini Beach, Poso
Tumbelaka Beach, Palu
 Talise Beach, Palu 
Tumpapa Beach, Malakosa Village, Sausu Subdistrict, Parigi Moutong
 Togean Beach, Togean National Park

Southeast Sulawesi
The beaches of Southeast Sulawesi are well known for marine biodiversity and are notable spot for scuba diving.
Batauga Beach, Baubau
Lanowulu Beach, Rawa Aopa Watumohai National Park. The beach is known for the mangrove forests.
Nambo Beach, Kendari
Nirwana Beach, Baubau

South Sulawesi

The beaches of South Sulawesi are well known for its marine biodiversity and are noted for its scuba diving.
Losari Beach, Makassar
Beaches of Selayar Islands. The island is known for its white sand and clear water.
Baloyya Beach
Tanjung Bira Beach, Bulukumba Regency. Tanjung Bira (English "Cape of Bira") contains three beaches: Pantai Bira, Pantai Timur, and Pantai Barat.

North Maluku
Being insular in character, beaches are extensive in North Maluku. The beaches are well known for their white sand and calm blue water. The largest island of Maluku, Halmahera, has a yet unexploited potential for diving and beach tourism. Relic of World War II can be found in the white-sand beach of Zum Zum (Sum Sum) Island where locals still look for discarded WWII machine guns, shell casings, and other valuable scrap.
Akasahu Beach, Tidore. The beach is popular for its hot spring pool.
Sulamadaha Beach, Ternate

Maluku
The more notables beaches of Maluku are well known for their white sand and clear water.
Debut Beach, Debut Village, Southeast Maluku Regency A shrine was built on top of the cliff.
Namalatu Beach, Ambon
Natsepa Beach, Ambon
[gur Bloat Beach (Pasir Panjang Beach), Ngilngof Village, Kai Kecil. The 3 km beach is best known for its white sanded beach whose softness is comparable to the softness of the flour.
Ohoidertawun Beach, Ohoidertawun
Ohoidertutu Beach, Kai Kecil
Ora Beach, Saleman, North Seram
Santai Beach, Ambon
Serbat Beach, Dullah Island

West Papua
One of the notable beaches of West Papua is the beach around Raja Ampat Islands. The sea around Raja Ampat contains the highest recorded marine life diversity on Earth.

Papua

The northern coast of Papua is exposed to the Pacific Ocean. There are bordering beaches of sand and gravel, supplied mainly from rivers. Coral reefs are extensive in the northern coast. The southern coast of Papua is mainly covered in extensive swamps and beach formations are limited.
Amai Beach, Jayapura
Amban Beach, Amban
Base-G Beach, Jayapura
Beaches of Biak Island. During World War II, the beach in Biak Island was the site of the Battle of Biak, which was the first major tactical use of an ambush by the Japanese during the war.
Bosnik Beach
Korem Beach. The beach was destroyed by an earthquake and tsunami in 1996; the beach and the surrounding village has been rebuilt.
Marau Beach
Parai Beach. The beach contains a World War II Monument built by the Japanese government.
Warsa Beach
Hamadi Beach, Jayapura. The beach is the site of a US amphibious landing on April 22, 1944. The beach contains a number of World War II wrecks and a World War II monument.
Holtekamp Beach, Jayapura
Ketuapi Beach, Yapen
Mariadei Beach, Yapen
Tanjung Ria Beach, Jayapura

See also
 List of beaches

References

Indonesia
Lists of landforms of Indonesia
Beaches